Gary Hinchley (born 14 November 1968) is an English former footballer who made 27 appearances in the Football League playing as a full back for Darlington in the 1980s and 1990s. He also played non-league football for clubs including Whitby Town and Guisborough Town.

References

1968 births
Living people
People from Guisborough
Sportspeople from Yorkshire
English footballers
Association football defenders
Darlington F.C. players
Whitby Town F.C. players
Guisborough Town F.C. players
English Football League players